Dharmashree is a Kannada language novel written by S L Bhyrappa.
This novel is about a man living who is a true believer of Sanathana Dharma. He converts to Christianity to marry a girl for his true love. The novel explores his inner search on true love versus true religion. He faces various advantages and disadvantages when converted to other religion. Meanwhile, she understand him very well more than himself he could and helps him to solve the internal conflicts. The main theme of the book is exploration of the problems in the society with respect to religions.

References

Kannada novels
1961 novels
1961 Indian novels
Novels by S. L. Bhyrappa